Justin Aldred Holland (born March 15, 1984) is an American real estate broker from Heath, Texas, who is a Republican member of the Texas House of Representatives for the 33rd District, which includes Rockwall County and a portion of Collin County. He won the general election held on November 8, 2016, and was sworn into office on January 10, 2017. He is currently serving his third term in the Texas House of Representatives.

Career in public service
He served five years on the Heath City Council, including two years as Mayor Pro Tem.

In the 85th Texas Legislature, Holland was appointed to the House committees on Homeland Security & Public Safety and Investments & Financial Services.

In the 86th Texas Legislature, Holland was appointed to the House committees on Culture, Recreation & Tourism and State Affairs.

In the 87th Texas Legislature, Holland was appointed as Vice Chair to the House Committee on Urban Affairs, the House Appropriations Committee, and the House Appropriations Subcommittee on Articles I, IV, & V. He is currently the Vice Chair of the Texas Sunset Advisory Commission and is serving a term to expire in 2025. The Commission has five Senators, five Representatives, and two members of the public, appointed by the Lieutenant Governor and the Speaker of the House. The position of chair rotates between the House and the Senate every two years.

In the general election held on November 6, 2018, Holland won reelection to his second term, 53,761 votes (65 percent), to 28,885 (35 percent) for Democrat Laura Gunn.

In the general election held on November 3, 2020, Holland won reelection to his third term, 77,504 (65 percent), to 41,827 (35 percent) for Democrat Andy Rose.

In the primary election held on March 1, 2022, Holland won his party's nomination for the fourth consecutive time with 6,402 votes (69.9 percent), to his two opponents who collectively garnered 2,326 votes (25.4 percent) and 429 votes (4.7 percent) respectively. He will face Democrat nominee Graeson Lynskey in November 2022.

Personal life
A sixth-generation Rockwall native, Holland graduated from Rockwall High School and Texas Tech University in Lubbock and then obtained a master's degree from Texas A&M University–Commerce in Commerce, Texas.

He is a member of Rockwall Rotary International, a 2014 graduate of Leadership Rockwall, former vice president of the Heath Economic Development and Municipal Benefits Corporations, an endowed member of East Trinity Lodge #157, a member of the Rockwall Republican Men's Club, a former member of the City of Heath Special Events Board, a volunteer for Rockwall County Relay for Life, past director of the Rockwall Independent School District Education Foundation, and a volunteer for Rockwall County Helping Hands. Holland is a 32° Scottish Rite Mason and is a noble of the Hella Shrine in Garland, Texas; both being affiliated bodies of Freemasonry.

Justin and his wife Neely have been married since 2008 and have two daughters. The Hollands are members of Lake Pointe Church, a large Southern Baptist congregation in Rockwall, Texas.

References

External links
 Campaign website
 Justin Holland at the Texas Tribune
Texas House of Representatives Member Page

1984 births
Living people
Republican Party members of the Texas House of Representatives
21st-century American politicians
People from Heath, Texas
Texas city council members
Businesspeople from Texas
Baptists from Texas
Texas Tech University alumni
Texas A&M University–Commerce alumni